Matlock Town is a civil parish in the Derbyshire Dales district of Derbyshire, England.  The parish contains 44 listed buildings that are recorded in the National Heritage List for England.  Of these, six are listed at Grade II*, the middle of the three grades, and the others are at Grade II, the lowest grade.   The parish contains the town of Matlock and the surrounding area.  Most of the listed buildings are houses, cottages and associated structures, farmhouses and farm buildings.  During the middle of the 19th century, Matlock became a centre for hydrotherapy, and buildings known as hydros were built for this purpose.  Two of the larger hydros have survived and are listed.  The other listed buildings include churches, a chapel, items in a churchyard, public houses, bridges, a former malthouse, a bank, a milestone, a former smithy, and a war memorial.


Key

Buildings

References

Citations

Sources

 

Lists of listed buildings in Derbyshire
Matlock, Derbyshire